Razor is a Canadian speed metal band formed in 1983 at Guelph, Ontario. They are recognized as the pioneers of Canadian thrash metal and have been referred to as one of the country's "big four", alongside Sacrifice, Voivod and Annihilator.

History

Early years and split (1983–1992)
Razor was formed in 1983 by guitarist Dave Carlo. A secondary member named John Scheffel was in the band at the time as the vocalist and guitarist, but left in 1984. After failed efforts with two other vocalists, Carlo would eventually establish a line-up featuring vocalist Stace "Sheepdog" McLaren, bassist Mike Campagnolo and drummer Mike "M-Bro" Embro. The founding members, the guitarist and rhythm section, were former school-mates. A 5-track demo was recorded in 1984 prior to the release of the Armed & Dangerous EP in May 1984 by Voice Records, which received underground acclaim. A pre-production demo album titled Escape the Fire was then recorded in December 1984, which would become the first full-length album Executioner's Song, released in April 1985 through Viper Records. It was followed up by Evil Invaders in October 1985. Razor performed in the United States and Canada with Slayer, Motörhead and Venom.

The third album Malicious Intent was released in April 1986. It suffered due to the build-up of internal conflicts within the band and the lack of an official release in the United States, which in turn led to their record company dropping the band. In 1987, the fourth album Custom Killing was released. Self-financed, the album met with poor commercial success and was in turn overlooked by fans, with the music moving to a more experimental approach than previous releases. Drummer Mike Embro and bassist Mike Campagnolo left the band shortly after the album's release and were replaced with Dave Carlo's brother Adam on bass and Rob Mills on drums. Razor returned to their roots with the fifth album Violent Restitution, which was released in 1988 by Steamhammer. It was well-received, being considered more aggressive and heavier than its predecessor.

Vocalist Stace McLaren's interest in the band declined which eventually led to his departure. He was replaced with SFH vocalist Bob Reid. The band then signed with Fringe Product and released Shotgun Justice in March 1990. They headlined smaller venues, performing with Sacrifice and Disciples of Power. Drummer Rob Mills was involved in an accident which made him unable to perform as a result. Adam Carlo left the band and was replaced with SFH bassist Jon Armstrong. The next album Open Hostility was released in 1991. Due to Mills' injury and inability to perform on the album, Dave Carlo used a drum machine to replicate his style. Mills later returned and Razor embarked on a tour in support of the album leading up to their final performance on October 2, 1992. Following the tour, the band split-up. A compilation called Exhumed was issued by Fringe Product during the band's absence.

Reformation and recent years (1996–present)

In 1996, Razor became active again as a result of vocalist Bob Reid's idea of reforming the band. Both Reid and Carlo were joined by Armstrong and SFH drummer Rich Oosterbosch. The eighth studio album Decibels was released in 1997 by Hypnotic Records. Armstrong and Oosterbosch would no longer be in the band and was replaced by returning members Rob Mills and Adam Carlo (before being replaced by Mike Campagnolo).

Razor took part on The Gates of Hell tour in 2005, the Headbangers Open Air Festival in 2009 and the True Thrash Festival in Osaka in 2011. A DVD of this performance was released only in Japan in February 2012.

On April 19, 2012, Carlo was diagnosed with Stage 2 oral cancer, but was successfully treated and resumed his guitar duties in 2015. The band performed at a charity event in 2014, the Maryland Deathfest in 2015 and the California Deathfest in 2016.

In 2014, drummer Rob Mills left the band and was replaced with Ripp'rd drummer Rider Johnson. In late 2018, Johnson announced his departure via Facebook and was replaced with Shareef "Reef" Hassanien for the majority of 2019. However, by the end of that year, Johnson rejoined the group.

The ninth studio album Cycle of Contempt was released on September 23, 2022, marking the first album in 25 years.

Members

Current members
 Dave Carlo – guitars (1983–1992, 1997–present)
 Mike Campagnolo – bass (1983–1987, 2005–2008, 2011–present)
 Bob Reid – vocals (1989–1992, 1997–present)
 Rider Johnson – drums (2014–2018, 2019–present)

Former members
 Mike 'M-Bro" Embro – drums (1983–1987)
 Stace "Sheepdog" McLaren – vocals (1984–1989)
 Rob Mills – drums (1988–1992, 1998–2014)
 Adam Carlo – bass (1988–1991, 2003–2005, 2008–2010)
 John Armstrong – bass (1991–1992, 1997–2002)
 Rich Oosterbosch – drums (1997)
 Shareef "Reef" Hassanien – drums (2018–2019)

Timeline

Discography

Studio albums
 Executioner's Song (1985)
 Evil Invaders (1985)
 Malicious Intent (1986)
 Custom Killing (1987)
 Violent Restitution (1988)
 Shotgun Justice (1990)
 Open Hostility (1991)
 Decibels (1997)
 Cycle of Contempt (2022)

EPs
 Armed & Dangerous (1984)

Live albums
 Live! Osaka Saikou (2016)

Demos
 Demo 84 (1984)
 Escape the Fire (1984)
 Decibels (1992)

Compilations
 Exhumed (1994)

Boxed sets
 35 Years Thrash Insanity (2020)

References

External links
  Current band website
 Dave Carlo on Twitter
 Biography
 Discography

Attic Records (Canada) artists
Canadian speed metal musical groups
Canadian thrash metal musical groups
Musical groups established in 1983
Musical groups from Guelph
Musical groups disestablished in 1992
Musical groups reestablished in 1996
1983 establishments in Ontario
1992 disestablishments in Ontario
1997 establishments in Ontario